Mirificarma constricta is a moth of the family Gelechiidae. It is found in northern Morocco.

The head is mid-brown. The forewings are mottled mid-brown, but slightly darker at the base. Adults are on wing in August and October.

References

Moths described in 1984
Mirificarma
Endemic fauna of Morocco
Moths of Africa